Castalagin is an ellagitannin, a type of hydrolyzable tannin, found in oak and chestnut wood and in the stem barks of Anogeissus leiocarpus and Terminalia avicennoides.

Castalagin is the diastereomer of vescalagin in C-1 of the glycosidic chain. Castalagin/ vescalagin are the most abundant ellagitannins in white wine stored in oak barrels. During aging of wines, these two compounds were progressively extracted from the wood and were transformed into new derivatives by chemical reactions. Therefore, castalagin/ vescalagin and their derivatives contribute to the color and the taste of wines and spirits stored in oak barrels.

Sources 
Castalagin was first isolated in Fagaceae family woody species : Quercus (oak) and Castanea (chestnut) by Walter Mayer and co-workers (1967).  In some chestnut species, such as Castanea sativa, heartwood could contain 63 mg of castalagin/ vescalagin per gram of dry wood.  In some wines, these two isomers represent about 40 to 70% of total ellagitannins.

Biosynthesis 
In some plants including oak and chestnut, the ellagitannins are formed from 1,2,3,4,6-pentagalloyl-glucose and further elaborated via oxidative dehydrogenation (tellimagrandin II and casuarictin formations). After conversion of casuarictin to pedunculagin, the pyranose ring of the glucose opens and the family of compounds including casuariin, casuarinin, castalagin, and castlin, vescalagin and vescalin forms.

Castalagin thus forms from a pentagalloyl-glucose structure. Castalagin and vescalagin (1,2,3,5-nonahydroxytriphenoyl-4,6-hexahydroxydiphenoyl-glucoses) can be further polymerized in their corresponding dimers roburin A and roburin D, and 33-carboxy-33-deoxyvescalagin.

Derivatives 
Castalagin and other related ellagitanins polymerizes or forms complexes with anthyocyanins and flavonoids. The flavono-ellagitannin known as acutissimin A is created when the oak tannin vescalagin interacts with catechin a flavan-3-ol found in wine.  Grandinin is a castalagin glycoside  which forms by binding to the pentose lyxose. Chemical hydrolysis of Castalagin/ Vescalagin produces vescalene and vescalin which are potent topoisomerase II inhibitors.

References 

Ellagitannins